Achurum is a genus of slant-faced grasshoppers in the family Acrididae. There are at least three described species in Achurum.

Species
 Achurum carinatum (Walker, 1870) (long-headed toothpick grasshopper)
 Achurum minimipenne Caudell, 1904 (tamaulipan toothpick grasshopper)
 Achurum sumichrasti (Saussure, 1861) (sumichrast toothpick grasshopper)

References

 Otte, Daniel (1995). "Grasshoppers [Acridomorpha] D". Orthoptera Species File 5, 630.

Acrididae genera
Gomphocerinae